Sange  may refer to:
 Sange, Tanahun, a village in the South Kivu Province of the Democratic Republic of the Congo
 Sange, Tanzania, an administrative ward in the Ileje district of the Mbeya Region
 Gary Sange, a contemporary American poet and professor of poetry at Virginia Commonwealth University
 Sange, Bhiwandi, a village in India
 Sange, an item in the computer game 'DOTA 2.'